Karangasem alt spelled Karang Asem is a Balinese name and may refer to:

Locations
 Kingdom of Karangasem, a former Bali kingdom where a royal palace was located, and the royal family itself
 Karangasem Regency of Bali province in Indonesia
 Karangasem District of Karangasem Regency, the seat of the former royal palace and eponymous main settlement, Karangasem

Subdistrict/Village 
 Karangasem, Bulu, Rembang
 Karangasem, Bulu, Sukoharjo
 Karangasem, Cawas, Klaten
 Karangasem, Cibeber, Cilegon
 Karangasem, Jenu, Tuban
 Karangasem, Karangasem, Karangasem
 Karangasem, Karangwareng, Cirebon
 Karangasem, Kertanegara, Purbalingga
 Karangasem, Klampis, Bangkalan
 Karangasem, Kutorejo, Mojokerto
 Karangasem, Lawiyan, Surakarta
 Karangasem, Leuwimunding, Majalengka
 Karangasem, Lumbang, Pasuruan
 Karangasem, Paliyan, Gunung Kidul
 Karangasem, Petarukan, Pemalang
 Karangasem, Plumbon, Cirebon
 Karangasem, Ponjong, Gunung Kidul
 Karangasem, Sampang, Cilacap
 Karangasem, Sayung, Demak
 Karangasem, Sedan, Rembang
 Karangasem, Talun, Pekalongan
 Karangasem, Tanon, Sragen
 Karangasem, Terisi, Indramayu
 Karang Asem, Tungkal Ilir, Banyuasin
 Karangasem, Wirosari, Grobogan
 Karangasem, Wonorejo, Pasuruan
 Karang Asem Barat, Citeureup, Bogor
 Karangasem Selatan, Batang, Batang
 Karang Asem Timur, Citeureup, Bogor
 Karangasem Utara, Batang, Batang

Railway Station 
 Karangasem Station of Java's Eastern Line Railway (Indonesia), in Glagah District of Banyuwangi Regency.